The 2009–10 Biathlon World Cup – Pursuit Men will start at Saturday December 13, 2009 in Hochfilzen and will finish Saturday March 20, 2010 in Oslo. Defending titlist is Ole Einar Bjørndalen of Norway.

Competition format
This is a pursuit competition. The biathletes' starts are separated by their time differences from a previous race, most commonly a sprint race. There are two prone shooting bouts and two standing bouts, in that order. The contestant crossing the finish line first is the winner.

To prevent awkward and/or dangerous crowding of the skiing loops, and overcapacity at the shooting range, World Cup Pursuits are held with only the 60 top ranking biathletes after the preceding race. The biathletes shoot (on a first-come, first-served basis) at the lane corresponding to the position they arrived for all shooting bouts.

Points are awarded for each event, according to each contestant's finish. When all events are completed. the contestant with the highest number of points is declared the season winner.

2008–09 Top 3 Standings

Medal winners

Standings

References

- Pursuit Men, 2009-10 Biathlon World Cup